Rajko Dujmić (7 August 1954 – 4 August 2020) was a Croatian  songwriter, composer and music producer best known as a member of the pop group Novi fosili.

He composed the winner entry of Eurovision Song Contest 1989, "Rock me", along with Stevo Cvikić. They also composed the two previous Yugoslavian entries, "Ja sam za ples", sung by Novi fosili, and "Mangup", sung by Srebrna Krila.

He received the Porin award for lifetime achievement at the Croatian music awards in 2013.

Personal life
He married his wife Snježana on 2 December 1990. He had a son Tin from a previous marriage.

After he was involved in a traffic accident in the village of Stari Laz, Primorje-Gorski Kotar County, on 29 July 2020, Dujmić died six days later, on 4 August, at the Rijeka Clinical Hospital Center. He was 65.

References

External links
 

1954 births
2020 deaths
Croatian songwriters
Eurovision Song Contest winners
Road incident deaths in Croatia
Eurovision Song Contest entrants of 1987
Eurovision Song Contest entrants for Yugoslavia
Burials at Mirogoj Cemetery